In human mitochondrial genetics, Haplogroup C is a human mitochondrial DNA (mtDNA) haplogroup.

Origin

Haplogroup C is believed to have arisen somewhere between the Caspian Sea and Lake Baikal some 24,000 years before present.  It is a descendant of the haplogroup M. Haplogroup C shares six mutations downstream of the MRCA of haplogroup M with haplogroup Z and five mutations downstream of the MRCA of haplogroup M with other members of haplogroup M8. This macro-haplogroup is known as haplogroup M8'CZ or simply as haplogroup M8.

Distribution

Haplogroup C is found in Northeast Asia (including Siberia) and the Americas. In Eurasia, Haplogroup C is especially frequent among populations of arctic Siberia, such as Nganasans, Dolgans, Yakuts, Evenks, Evens, Yukaghirs, and Koryaks. Haplogroup C is one of five mtDNA haplogroups found in the indigenous peoples of the Americas, the others being A, B, D, and X. The subclades C1b, C1c, C1d, and C4c are found in the first people of the Americas. C1a is found only in Asia.

In 2010, Icelandic researchers discovered C1e lineage in their home country, estimating an introduction date of year 1700 AD or earlier, indicating a possible introduction during the Viking expeditions to the Americas. A Native American origin for this C1e lineage is likely, but the researchers note that a European or Asian one cannot be ruled out.

In 2014, a study discovered a new mtDNA subclade C1f from the remains of 3 people found in north-western Russia and dated to 7,500 years ago. It has not been detected in modern populations. The study proposed the hypothesis that the sister C1e and C1f subclades had split early from the most recent common ancestor of the C1 clade and had evolved independently. Subclade C1e had a northern European origin. Iceland was settled by the Vikings 1,130 years ago and they had raided heavily into western Russia, where the sister subclade C1f is now known to have resided. They proposed that both subclades were brought to Iceland through the Vikings, however C1e went extinct on mainland northern Europe due to population turnover and its small representation, and subclade C1f went extinct completely.

In 2015, a study conducted in the Aconcagua mummy identified its mtDNA lineage belongs to the subclade C1bi, which contains 10 distinct mutations from C1b.

Table of Frequencies by ethnic group

Subclades

Tree
This phylogenetic tree of haplogroup C subclades is based on the paper by Mannis van Oven and Manfred Kayser Updated comprehensive phylogenetic tree of global human mitochondrial DNA variation and subsequent published research.

CZ
C - Russia (Bashkortostan), India
C1 - Paraguay (Alto Parana), ancient DNA from specimen I0061 (from Yuzhniy Oleni Ostrov, Lake Onega, Russia, 7450 - 6950 ybp)
C1a
C1a* – Ulchi, Nanai, Daur
C1a1 – Buryat, Kyrgyz (Kyrgyzstan)
C1a2 – Japan
C1b
C1b*
C1b1
C1b1*
C1b1a
C1b1a* – Mexican American
C1b1a1 – Mexican American
C1b1b – Native American, Mexican American
C1b2
C1b2* – Peru, Paraguay
C1b2a – Peru
C1b2b – Colombia
C1b2c
C1b2c* – USA, Puerto Rico, Paraguay, Spain
C1b2c1 – Paraguay
C1b3
C1b3* – Peru
C1b3a - Indonesia (Java, Borneo, Sumatera, Papua Nugini dan Sulawesi)
C1b3a* – Peru
C1b3a1 – Argentina
C1b4 – Ecuador, Peru, USA
C1b5
C1c
C1c1
C1c2
C1d – Argentina (Buenos Aires), Colombia (Boyacá), Mexico (Tamaulipas, Guanajuato, Chihuahua, etc.), United States (Mexican Americans), Canada (Shuswap)
C1d1
C1d2 – Colombia (Mestizo)
C1d2a – Colombia (Mestizos)
C1e – Iceland
C1f – Pamiri Tajik (Gorno-Badakhshan), India (Marathi), Scotland, Italy, Mesolithic NW Russia
C1g – Mesolithic NW Russia (Karelia)
C4 – Upper Palaeolithic (14050 - 13770 ybp) Ust-Kyakhta (Buryatia), Late Neolithic-Bronze Age Irkutsk Oblast, Late Neolithic-Iron Age Yakutia, Tubalar (Ederbes), Todzhin (Toora-Hem, Iiy, Adir-Kezhig), Yukaghir (Andrushkino), Yukaghir/Chuvan (Markovo), Russian, Myanmar
C4a'b'c - Irkutsk Oblast (6815 ybp), India (Jenu Kuruba)
C4a – China (Guangdong, Han from Beijing)
C4a1 – Tashkurgan (Kyrgyz, Sarikoli, Wakhi), Czech Republic, Denmark
C4a1a – Korea, China, Uyghur, Buryat (South Siberia), Denmark, Sweden, France, Scotland, Canada
C4a1a1
C4a1a1a
C4a1a1a1 - Lepcha, Sherpa (Nepal)
C4a1a1a2 - Lachungpa
C4a1a1a3 - Wancho
C4a1a1b - Poland, Finland (Hamina)
C-T195C! – Ireland, Scotland, England, USA, Hungary (Szeged region), Poland, Belarus, Russia (Russian, Buryat), Turkey, Pakistan (Hazara), India (Jammu and Kashmir), China (Bargut and Mongol in Inner Mongolia, etc.), Korea
C4a1a2 – China
C4a1a2a – China (Han from Ili, Han from Henan, etc.)
C4a1a2b
C4a1a2b1 - China
C4a1a2b2 - Uyghur
C4a1a3 – Bronze Age Irkutsk Oblast (Ust'-Belaya, Khaptsagai, Silinskij, Chastaja Padi), Russian (Kemerovo Oblast), Koryak, Yukaghir, Yakut, Evenk (Nyukzha, Chumikan, Nelkan/Dzhigda), Even (Sakkyryyr, Sebjan, Tompo, Markovo, Kamchatka), Udinsk Buryat (Kushun), Todzhin (Toora-Hem, Adir-Kezhig), Altai Kizhi, Iran (Qashqai), Sweden
C4a1a3a – Yakut, Buryat (Buryat Republic, Irkutsk Oblast), Bargut, Nentsi
C4a1a3a1 – Yakut, Nganasan (Vadei of Taimyr Peninsula) 
C4a1a3a1a - Evenk (Taimyr, Stony Tunguska)
C4a1a3a1b - Tofalar
C4a1a3b – Bargut, Uyghur
C4a1a3b1 - Chelkan, Tubalar
C4a1a3c – Evenk (Taimyr Peninsula, Stony Tunguska) 
C4a1a3d – Yakut
C4a1a4 – Buryat, Kazakhstan
C4a1a4a – Evenk (Okhotsk region), Shor
C4a1a5 – Teleut, Ladakh
C4a1a6
C4a1a6a - Russia (Bashkortostan, Khamnigan), Kyrgyzstan (Kyrgyz), Inner Mongolia (Bargut, Buryat)
C4a1a6b - Buryat (South Siberia, Inner Mongolia), Uyghur
C4a1a7 - Denmark
C4a1b – China, Thailand (Palaung)
C4a1c - Russia (Bashkortostan, Adygei), Iran (Azerbaijanian), China (Xibo)
C4a2
C4a2a – Yakut, Evenk (Chumikan)
C4a2a1 – Bronze Age (2275 - 2040 cal BC) Irkutsk Oblast (specimen irk076 from burial 3 at the Shamanka 2 site, South Baikal), Shor, Chelkan, Teleut, Altai Kizhi, Yakut, Kazakh, Ket, Evenk (Stony Tunguska, Taimyr), Buryat (Irkutsk Oblast, Inner Mongolia), China, Korea
C4a2a1a – Yukaghir, Yakut, Evenk (Nyukzha, Iyengra, Nelkan/Dzhigda), Even (Tompo)
C4a2a1b – Evenk (Nyukzha), Yakut
C4a2a1b1 - Evenk (Nyukzha)
C4a2a1c - China (Zhejiang, Uyghurs), Buryat, Todzhin (Iiy), Karanogay (Dagestan)
C4a2a1c1 - Tofalar (Alygdzher, Nerkha, V. Gutara), Khamnigan
C4a2a1c2 - Uyghurs
C4a2a1d - Uyghurs
C4a2a1d1 - Udinsk Buryat (Kushun), Tofalar (V. Gutara), Evenk (Central Siberia)
C4a2a1d2 - Evenk (Nelkan/Dzhigda), Evenk/Nivkh (Val)
C4a2a1e - Bargut (Inner Mongolia), Buryat (Irkutsk Oblast)
C4a2a1f - Buryat (South Siberia, Irkutsk Oblast)
C4a2a1g - Ket
C4a2b – Tibet, Korea
C4a2b1 – Wancho
C4a2b2 – China (Han from Beijing)
C4a2b2a – Tibet (Sherpa)
C4a2c – Bargut (Inner Mongolia)
C4a2c1 – India (Jenu Kuruba)
C4a2c2 – Lepcha
C4a2c2a – Ladakh
C4b – Yukaghir, Altai Kizhi, Ukraine, Slovakia
C4b1 – Yukaghir, Buryat
C4b1a – Bargut (Inner Mongolia)
C4b1b – Evenk (Stony Tunguska), Buryat
C4b2 – Koryak
C4b2a – Koryak, Chukchi
C4b3 – Yakut, Altai Kizhi
C4b3a – Yukaghir, Even (Berezovka)
C4b3a1 – Yukaghir
C4b3b – Buryat, Evenk (Stony Tunguska)
C4b5 – Khamnigan, Buryat
C4b6 – Altai Kizhi, Tubalar
C4b7 – Yukaghir
C4b8 – Yakut
C4b8a – Nganasan
C4c – Ijka
C4c1 – Sioux (Carson County of South Dakota), Shuswap, Canada, USA, France, Spain
C4c1a – Cherokee (Flint District of Oklahoma)
C4c1b – Chippewa (Trempealeau in Wisconsin), Ottawa or Chippewa (Sault Saint Marie, Chippewa County, Michigan), Canada
C4c2 – Métis (Red River, Manitoba), USA
C4-T152C! – Russia (Bashkortostan), England
C4-T152C!-A12780G - Uyghur
C4d – Turkey, Tibet (Chamdo, Nyingchi, Shannan, Lhoba), Thailand (Khon Mueang from Chiang Mai Province), Han from Beijing
C4-T152C!-T4742C - Altai Republic (ancient DNA), Uyghur
C4-T152C!-T4742C-T16093C - Kyrgyz (Kyrgyzstan), Tibet (Nyingchi)
C4-T152C!-T4742C-T8602C - Sarikoli (Tashkurgan), Burusho (Pakistan)
C4-T152C!-T4742C-T8602C-G11176A - Pamiri (Gorno-Badakhshan Autonomous Region of Tajikistan)
C4e – Teleut, Shor
C5 – India
C5a – Azeri
C5a1 – Bargut (Inner Mongolia), Buryat (Irkutsk Oblast), Xibo (HGDP), Kazakhstan
C5a1a - Khanty, Altai Kizhi
C5a1b - Even (Severo-Evensk district), Ulchi
C5a1c - Yakut, Khamnigan (South Siberia)
C5a1d - Buryat (South Siberia, Inner Mongolia)
C5a1e - Uyghur
C5a1f - Uyghur
C5a2
C5a2a – Buryat (South Siberia, Buryat Republic), Turkey
C5a2a1 - Evenk (Nyukzha, Iyengra)
C5a2b – Yukaghir (Nelemnoye), Koryak, Chukchi, Evenk (Nelkan/Dzhigda), Even (Kamchatka)
C5a2b1 – Koryak
C5b – Poland
C5b1 – Buryat (South Siberia), Tofalar, Todjin, Tuvan, Sojot, Ladakh, Japan
C5b1a – Evenk (Central Siberia)
C5b1a1 – Nganasan, Yakut, Buryat (South Siberia), Khamnigan (South Siberia), Kyrgyz (Tashkurgan)
C5b1a1a - Tofalar (Nerkha, Alygdzher, V. Gutara), Todzhi-Tuva (Alygdzher), Buryat (South Siberia)
C5b1a2 - Altai Kizhi (South Siberia), Irtysh-Barabinsk Tatar (Novosibirsk Oblast)
C5b1b – Khakas
C5b1b* – Buryat (South Siberia), Russia (Chechen Republic), Bulgaria (Turk in Dobrich)
C5b1b1 – Yakut
C5b1b1a - Yakut, Even (Sebjan), Evenk (Stony Tunguska), Russian
C5b1b2 - Uyghur
C5-T16093C – Japan (Aichi), Han (Beijing)
C5c – Tubalar, Teleut, Afghanistan, Persian (Iran), Czech Republic
C5c-C16234T – Kurd (Iran), Armenia, Turkey, Kuwait
C5c1 – Poland, Sweden, Greece
C5c1a – Russian (Uzbekistan), Ukraine, Lithuania, Poland, Slovakia, Austria, Germany, England, Scotland, Ireland, Italy, USA, Canada
C5d – China, Vietnam (Hmong)
C5d1 – Altai Kizhi, Tuvan, Evenk (Stony Tunguska), Yukaghir
C5d2 – Khamnigan, China
C7 – South Korea (Seoul), China,  Taiwan (Hakka), Thailand (Khon Mueang in Chiang Rai Province, Chiang Mai Province, and Lamphun Province), Vietnam (Kinh, Tay, Jarai)
C7a – Han (Beijing, Yunnan, Denver, etc.), Uyghur, Taiwan (Paiwan, Minnan), Lahu, Thailand (incl. Urak Lawoi, Lao Isan in Chaiyaphum Province, Khon Mueang in Lamphun Province, Khon Mueang in Lampang Province, Kaleun in Nakhon Phanom Province, Black Tai in Loei Province, Phuan in Suphan Buri Province), Vietnam (Hani, Yao, Gelao)
C7a1 – China, Taiwan (Makatao), USA (Han Chinese in Denver), Korea
C7a1a – Thailand (Mon in Lopburi Province)
C7a1a1 – Wancho
C7a1a2 – Dirang Monpa
C7a1b – Northern Thailand (Tai Lue), Vietnam (Nung)
C7a1c – Uyghurs, Chinese (Fengcheng, Shandong, Fujian, Taixing, etc.), Taiwan, Korea, Vietnam
C7a1c1 – Evenk (Central Siberia, Nyukzha River basin, Okhotsk region), Uyghur
C7a1d – Wancho
C7a1f – Thailand (Karen)
C7a1f1 – Thailand (Karen, Shan, Khon Mueang from Mae Hong Son Province, Mon from Kanchanaburi Province)
C7a1f1a – Thailand (S'gaw Karen, Khon Mueang in Chiang Rai Province)
C7a2 – China, Dai, Laos (Lao in Luang Prabang), Thailand (Khon Mueang in Chiang Mai Province, Khon Mueang in Chiang Rai Province, Lao Isan in Roi Et Province, Phutai in Sakon Nakhon Province, Mon in Nakhon Ratchasima Province), Myanmar (Yangon)
C7a2a – China (Shantou, etc.), Taiwan (Hakka, Makatao, etc.)
C7a3
C7a4
C7a5
C7a6
C7-A16051G – Bargut (Inner Mongolia)
C7b – Gallong, Naxi, Ukraine, Moldova, Austria
C7c – Korea
C7d – Taiwan (Hakka), Vietnam (Vietnamese), Thailand (Khon Mueang in Mae Hong Son Province, Lao Isan in Roi Et Province), Cambodia (Kampong Cham)
C7e – Cambodia (Takéo), Thailand (Khmer in Surin Province)

Popular culture
In his popular book The Seven Daughters of Eve, Bryan Sykes named the originator of this mtDNA haplogroup Chochmingwu.

See also

Genealogical DNA test
Genetic genealogy
Human mitochondrial genetics
Population genetics
Human mitochondrial DNA haplogroups
Indigenous American genetic studies

References

Bibliography

External links
General
Ian Logan's Mitochondrial DNA Site
Mannis van Oven's Phylotree
Haplogroup C
Spread of Haplogroup C, from National Geographic

C